"The Actual" was the lead single released from All City's debut album, Metropolis Gold. The song was produced by legendary producer DJ Premier and became the biggest hit in All City's brief career, peaking at number 75 on the Billboard Hot 100 and number three on the Billboard Hot Rap Singles.

Single track listing

A-Side
"The Actual" (Clean) – 4:14
"The Actual" (Dirty) – 4:12
"The Actual" (Instrumental) – 4:15

B-Side
"Priceless" (Clean) – 4:14
"Priceless" (Dirty) – 4:10
"Priceless" (Instrumental) – 4:13

Charts

Year-end

References

1998 debut singles
Song recordings produced by DJ Premier
1997 songs